"Let Go of the Stone" is a song written by Max D. Barnes and Max T. Barnes, and recorded by American country music artist John Anderson.  It was released in November 1992 as the fifth single from his album Seminole Wind.  The song reached number 7 on the Billboard Hot Country Singles & Tracks chart in 1993.

Critical reception
Deborah Evans Price, of Billboard magazine reviewed the song favorably, calling it "a thoughtfully written and exquisitely executed ballad." She goes on to say that Anderson is "at his most emotionally persuasive here."

Music video
The music video was directed by Michael Salomon and premiered on CMT, The Nashville Network and GAC in late 1992.

Chart performance
"Let Go of the Stone" debuted at number 59 on the U.S. Billboard Hot Country Singles & Tracks for the week of November 28, 1992.

References

1992 singles
John Anderson (musician) songs
Songs written by Max D. Barnes
Songs written by Max T. Barnes
Song recordings produced by James Stroud
BNA Records singles
1992 songs